Poly [ADP-ribose] polymerase 3 is an enzyme that in humans is encoded by the PARP3 gene.

The protein encoded by this gene belongs to the PARP family. These enzymes modify nuclear proteins by poly-ADP-ribosylation, which is required for DNA repair, regulation of apoptosis, and maintenance of genomic stability. This gene encodes the poly(ADP-ribosyl)transferase 3, which is preferentially localized to the daughter centriole throughout the cell cycle. Alternatively spliced transcript variants encoding different isoforms have been identified.

References

Further reading

External links